The Independent Socialist Party was a political party in Greece. The party was formed in 1931, through a split in the Socialist Party of Greece. The party was led by the trade union leader Dimitris Stratis. In 1932, the Independent Socialist Party was dissolved and Stratis returned to the Socialist Party.

References

Defunct socialist parties in Greece
Political parties established in 1931
Defunct political parties in Greece
1931 establishments in Greece